"Shoot Out the Lights" is a single by British heavy metal band Diamond Head released in 1980 by Happy Face Records, the band's own label. It was a single A-side with "Shoot Out the Lights" and "Helpless" as the B-side, and was only available on 7", without a picture sleeve in order to reduce production costs. 

An extended version of "Helpless" appeared on Diamond Head's 1980 debut Lightning to the Nations, and "Shoot Out the Lights" eventually appeared on an expanded version of the debut album released in 2001 by Sanctuary Records. 

The EP received much criticism from heavy metal fans claiming that "it wasn't metal enough". The band, though scoffing at these comments, was seen in live concerts playing more hardcore versions of beloved songs.

"Helpless" was covered by heavy metal band Metallica on their 1987 The $5.98 E.P. – Garage Days Re-Revisited EP.

Track listing
 "Shoot Out the Lights"
 "Helpless"

Lineup
Brian Tatler
Sean Harris
Duncan Scott
Colin Kimberley

Charts

References 

1980 singles
Diamond Head (band) songs